John Sykes (born 1959) is an English rock guitarist, vocalist and songwriter.

John Sykes may also refer to:

 John Sykes (composer) (1909–1962), composer and music teacher
 John Sykes (politician) (born 1956), British Conservative Member of Parliament for Scarborough, 1992–1997
 John H. Sykes, American businessman in Tampa Bay
 John Sykes (American businessman) (born 1955), co-founder of MTV, president of Entertainment Enterprises for Clear Channel Media Holdings
 John Sykes (footballer) (born 1950), English footballer
 John Sykes (American football) (born 1949), American football running back